The 2008 Sacramento State Hornets football team represented California State University, Sacramento as a member of the Big Sky Conference during the 2008 NCAA Division I FCS football season. Led by second-year head coach Marshall Sperbeck, Sacramento State compiled an overall record of 6–6 with a mark of 3–5 in conference play, tying for sixth place in the Big Sky. The team was outscored by its opponents 324 to 319 for the season. The Hornets played home games at Hornet Stadium in Sacramento, California.

Schedule

References

Sacramento State
Sacramento State Hornets football seasons
Sacramento State Hornets football